Bobby McMann (born June 15, 1996) is a Canadian professional ice hockey centre currently playing with the Toronto Marlies in the American Hockey League (AHL) as a prospect to the Toronto Maple Leafs of the National Hockey League (NHL).

Playing career
While playing for the Bonnyville Pontiacs of the Alberta Junior Hockey League (AJHL), McMann committed to Colgate University to play with the university's Raiders hockey club at the age of 20. In his final year with the Pontiacs, McMann was the recipient of the Pipeline AJHL Scholarship Award, awarded for 'leadership, sportsmanship, dedication and citizenship' to one member of each AJHL squad for use towards post-secondary education. Although first eligible to be drafted in the 2014 NHL Entry Draft while with the Raiders, McMann was never selected in an NHL draft.

McMann played four seasons with the Raiders, serving as alternate captain for his penultimate season and captain of the team during his final year, during which he was also nominated for the Hobey Baker Award. At the conclusion of his college career, McMann signed a two-year contract with the Toronto Marlies of the American Hockey League (AHL).

Impacted by the COVID-19 pandemic, McMann's first professional season was split across the AHL and East Coast Hockey League (ECHL)'s Wichita Thunder, considered to be a level below the AHL. With the Thunder, McMann record 17 points in 18 games, while producing a modest 4 points in 21 games with the Marlies in a limited bottom-six forward role. In his sophomore season, at the age of 25, established himself as a top-six forward in the Marlies lineup, appearing with the club for most of the 2021–22 season and earning a spot on the team's top power play unit. McMann would finish the season with 24 goals, establishing a new franchise record for most goals in a season by a rookie, surpassing Josh Leivo who recorded 23. McMann was in a race with teammate and fellow rookie Alex Steeves for the second half of the season for the franchise rookie scoring title; Steeves would finish the campaign with 23. In reward for his play, the Toronto Maple Leafs, the Marlies' parent club and NHL affiliate, signed McMann to a two-year, entry level contract worth slightly over league minimum.

The following season, McMann continued his strong play. After recording six points in three games to be named the AHL's Player of the Week for January 8, 2023 (for a collective season total of 15 points in 17 games played), McMann was recalled by the Maple Leafs on January 10, after placing defenceman T.J. Brodie on injury reserve. The following day, after Maple Leafs star centre Auston Matthews was held from the lineup from injury, McMann made his NHL debut in a contest against the Nashville Predators; in the process, he became the first Maple Leafs player to wear number 74. After 8 games with the Maple Leafs, McMann was returned to the Marlies; he recorded one disallowed goal in his NHL stint in a depth role with the team's fourth line.

Personal life
McMann began skating at the age of two. While at Colgate University, McMann majored in economics and minored in theater. As a student athlete, McMann was a four time ECAC Hockey All-Academic Team honouree.

Career statistics

Notes

References

External links
 

1996 births
Living people
Canadian ice hockey centres
Colgate Raiders men's ice hockey players
Ice hockey people from Alberta
Toronto Maple Leafs players
Toronto Marlies players
Undrafted National Hockey League players